Maisa Kuusikko (born 16 June 2005) is a Finnish artistic gymnast.  She represented Finland at the inaugural junior World Championships.  She is the 2021 Finnish national champion and a two-time junior national champion.  At the 2022 World Championships Kuusikko made history by becoming the first Finnish gymnast to qualify to the all-around final.

Early life
Kuusikko was born in Tampere, Finland.  She began training in gymnastics in 2011.

Gymnastics career

Junior

2018
Kuusikko competed at the Finnish National Championships where she placed third in the all-around and second on uneven bars. She made her international debut at the 2018 Nordic Championships where she helped Finland place third.  Individually she placed eighth in the all-around and second on uneven bars behind Tonya Paulsson.

2019
Kuusikko competed at the Stella Zakharova Cup where she won a pair of bronze on vault and uneven bars.  At the Nordic Championships she helped Finland place first.  Individually she placed second in the all-around behind Camille Rasmussen but won gold on vault and balance beam.  She won the junior national title at the Finnish Championships and was named to the team to compete at the inaugural Junior World Championships alongside Ilona Kossila and Malla Montell.  Kuusikko finished 39th in the all-around and was the highest placing Finnish gymnast.  In December she competed at the Voronin Cup where she placed fifth in the all-around, third on vault, second on uneven bars and balance beam, and sixth on floor exercise.

2020 
The mass majority of competitions in 2020 were either canceled or postponed due to the global COVID-19 pandemic.  In November Kuusikko competed at the Finnish Championships where she defended her junior national title.  Additionally she won gold on vault, uneven bars, and balance beam and placed second on floor exercise behind Olivia Vättö.

Senior

2021
Kuusikko turned senior in 2021.  She made her senior international debut at the 2021 European Championships where she qualified to the all-around final.  During the final she placed thirteenth.  In September she competed at the Finnish Championships and won her first senior national title.  Additionally she won the uneven bars and balance beam titles and placed second on vault behind Kaia Tanskanen.  Kuusikko was selected to represent Finland at the World Championships alongside Ada Hautala and Rosanna Ojala.

2022
Kuusikko competed at the Baku World Cup where she placed fifth on vault and floor exercise.  She next competed at the Varna Challenge Cup where she won silver on balance beam behind Ana Đerek, bronze on vault behind Aline Friess and Camille Rasmussen, and eighth on uneven bars.

Kuusikko later represented Finland at the 2022 World Championships in Liverpool, England, contributing to the Finnish team's 16th place finish during qualifications. She advanced to the individual all-around final in 29th place, becoming the first Finnish gymnast to do so in World Championships history.  During the all-around final Kuusikko finished thirteenth.

Competitive history

References

External links
 

2005 births
Living people
Finnish female artistic gymnasts
Gymnasts from Tampere